The Intel 440FX (codenamed Natoma), is a chipset from Intel, supporting the Pentium Pro and Pentium II processors. It is the first chipset from Intel that supports Pentium II. It is also known as i440FX and was released in May 1996. Official part numbers include the 82441FX and the 82442FX.

440FX does not support UltraDMA, SDRAM, or AGP. Its southbridge counterpart is the PIIX3.

It was replaced by Intel 440LX.

The designers of the QEMU emulator originally chose to simulate this chipset and its counterpart PIIX3.

See also
 PCI bus bridges
 List of Intel chipsets

References

External links
Intel 440FX ("Natoma")
Intel 440 Chipset Family technical documentation

440FX